Lateef and the Chief (sometimes stylized as Lateef & the Chief) is an American hip hop group from California. Originally known as Maroons, it consists of rapper Lateef the Truthspeaker (of Latyrx) and producer Chief Xcel (of Blackalicious). In 2004, the duo released their debut album, Maroons: Ambush.

Members
 Lateef the Truthspeaker (Lateef Daumont) – rapper
 Chief Xcel (Xavier Mosley) – producer

Discography
Albums
 Maroons: Ambush (2004)

Singles
 "Lester Hayes" (2002)
 "Best of Me" (2004)

References

External links
 
 

Hip hop groups from California
American musical duos
Musical groups established in 1997
Hip hop duos
Quannum Projects artists
1997 establishments in California